Teddy Apriyana Romadonsyah (born April 9, 1990), is an Indonesian professional basketball player.  He currently plays for the JNE BSC Bandung Utama club of the Indonesian Basketball League.

He represented Indonesia's national basketball team at the 2016 SEABA Cup.

References

External links
 Indonesian Basketball League profile
 NBL Indonesia profile
 Asia-basket.com profile

1990 births
Living people
Indonesian men's basketball players
Shooting guards
Small forwards
Sportspeople from Bandung